Daniele Munari (born 16 June 1983) is an Italian skier. He competed in the Nordic combined event at the 2006 Winter Olympics.

References

External links
 

1983 births
Living people
Italian male Nordic combined skiers
Olympic Nordic combined skiers of Italy
Nordic combined skiers at the 2006 Winter Olympics
People from Asiago
Sportspeople from the Province of Vicenza